Qaleh Rasul Seyat (also Romanized as Qal‘eh Rasūl Seyat) is a village in Akhtachi-ye Mahali Rural District, Simmineh District, Bukan County, West Azerbaijan Province, Iran. After a 2006 census, its recorded population was 478, made up of 104 families.

References 

Populated places in Bukan County